Wendy Gebauer Palladino (born Wendy Sue Gebauer; December 25, 1966) is an American retired soccer forward and former member of the United States women's national soccer team. Considered a pioneer of women's soccer in the United States, Gebauer played on the 1991 United States women's national soccer team that won the first Women's World Cup in China. She was inducted into the Virginia-DC Soccer Hall of Fame in 2009.

Early life
Gebauer grew up in Reston, Virginia and began playing soccer at age six.

University of North Carolina
Gebauer attended the University of North Carolina and played for the Tar Heels led by national team coach at the time, Anson Dorrance. A highly decorated player, Gebauer was a three-time All-American, three-time National Champion, and was also on the Atlantic Coast Conference Academic Honor Roll.

Playing career

Club

Raleigh Wings
From 1998 to 2000, Gebauer played for the Raleigh Wings and was co-captain of the two-time National Championship winning team in the W-League.

Raleigh Capital Express
In 1999, Gebauer made history when she became the first female to suit up and play with men on the Raleigh Capital Express a team in the second level division in the United States at the time. Nearly 2,000 fans showed up for the game, one of the largest crowds for the season.

International
Gebauer played for the United States women's national soccer team from 1987 to 1991. In 1991, she was part of the team that won the first Women's World Cup in China and scored a goal during the final group match.

Sports broadcasting career
Gebauer was the color commentator for collegiate women's soccer on the Fox Sports Network for five years. For seven years, she was the lead analyst for coverage of the U.S. Women's National Soccer team on ESPN, including the 1999 and 2003 Women's World Cup. In 2001, she was an analyst for TNT during their broadcast of WUSA games, the first women's professional soccer league in the United States.

References

External links
 
 Virginia-DC Soccer Hall of Fame profile

Living people
1966 births
People from Reston, Virginia
Soccer players from Virginia
United States women's international soccer players
Women's association football forwards
North Carolina Tar Heels women's soccer players
1991 FIFA Women's World Cup players
Raleigh (Capital) Express players
A-League (1995–2004) players
USL W-League (1995–2015) players
FIFA Women's World Cup-winning players
American women's soccer players
Women's United Soccer Association commentators
Raleigh Wings players